The 1953 Southern Conference baseball tournament was held in Raleigh, North Carolina, from May 14 through 16. This was the league's final championship tournament to be held until 1984, as seven schools, including three participants in the tournament, departed the conference to form the Atlantic Coast Conference after the season. Modern Southern Conference baseball records begin with the 1954 baseball season. The South Division's second seed Duke won the tournament for the third time.

Seeding 
The top two teams from each division participated in the tournament. Complete standings are not available, but the teams below all fielded baseball teams within the Southern Conference.

Bracket

References 

Southern Conference Baseball Tournament
1953 Southern Conference baseball season
Southern Conference base